The girls' rhythmic individual all-around at the 2014 Summer Youth Olympics was held on August 26–27 at the Nanjing Olympic Sports Centre.
There were two rounds of competition in the individual competition. In each round, competing gymnasts performed four routines. One routine was performed with each of the four apparatus: rope, hoop, ball and clubs. The combined scores from the four routines made up the preliminary qualifications round score. The top eight gymnasts after the preliminary round advanced to the finals. There, they performed each routine again. Scores from the preliminary will not be carried over, the gymnasts start back their routines with maximum of D10/E10 in base value.

Medalists

Qualification

Final

References 

 Nanjing 2014 Qualification
 Nanjing 2014 Final

Gymnastics at the 2014 Summer Youth Olympics